Oakhurst House is a derelict building in Shining Cliff Woods above the village of Ambergate in Derbyshire. The house was built in 1848 by Francis Hurt behind his iron forge in Ambergate. It was owned by the Johnson family of industrialists for many years who were benefactors in the local area, building the parish church of St. Anne at Ambergate.

History

19th–early 20th century
Originally a forge house, it was leased by the Hurts to the Iron Master Charles Mold, who died there in 1846. Hurt persuaded the young William Henry Mold to live at Oakhurst in 1847 and promised £1,000 to rebuild it. Construction of the new house was by Robinson of Belper and the new house was ready for occupation in 1848. Mold occupied the house and forge until 1859 when all works ceased.

The forge and house appear to have remained vacant until in 1876 the forge was purchased by the Richard Johnson and Nephew wire company of Manchester and a wireworks was established on the site.  The house was retained by the Hurt family until 1888 when it was purchased by The Midland Railway, with their architect Charles Trubshaw extending the house for the chief engineer. Also built at this time were a range of stone stables situated just north of the house.

In 1893, the house was purchased by Thewlis Johnson, owner of the forge, and it was extended further in 1894 by architect John Douglas in the neo-Jacobean Arts and Crafts style for which it is best known locally. Between 1924 and 1939, the house was used as a retreat for the local diocese. The house is described as a "fair-sized country mansion" with "accommodation for twenty four" and a "large room being converted to a comely chapel".

Late 20th–21st century
With the post-war housing crisis, Oakhurst House was divided into twelve flats during 1945. However, during the 1970s with the deteriorating condition of the building and an increase in local council housing the residents were found alternative accommodation. Since then, the house has remained unoccupied and is now derelict.

In 1994, permission was granted to demolish the house as it was beyond repair; however, the permission has now expired and no demolition has taken place. In 2000 the wireworks and estate were purchased by the Lichfield Group and the wireworks are now used as industrial storage. The stables and various other estate buildings are now leased as private accommodation.

Current deterioration

References

Houses in Derbyshire
Country houses in Derbyshire